Rajamahendravaram Municipal Corporation (also known as RMC, formerly known as Rajahmundry Municipal Corporation) is the civic body that governs the city of Rajamahendravaram in the Indian state of Andhra Pradesh.

History 
The Municipal Corporation mechanism in India was introduced during British Rule with formation of municipal corporation in Madras (Chennai) in 1688, later followed by municipal corporations in Bombay (Mumbai) and Calcutta (Kolkata) by 1762.

Rajahmundry municipal corporation is one of the oldest corporations which started in the year 1866. It was headed by the British till 1884 and when they had permitted contesting for municipal chairman elections. N. Subba Rao Pantulu served in this municipal corporation. First Chief Minister of Andhra Pradesh Tanguturi Prakasam Panthulu also won as chairman in 1903. Zamindar of Dharmavaram Kanchumarthi Ramachandra Rao and many others took active participation in it. Vogeti Ramakrishnayya garu served as municipal councilor for a long time. Nidamarthi Durgaiah, Mocherla Ramchandra Rao, Eluri Lakshmi Narasimham etc acted as chairman for this council. Maturi Srinivasa Chakravarthi was the first mayor of the city.

Administration 
Rajamahendravaram Municipal Corporation (RMC) is administered by an elected body, headed by the Mayor. As per the 2011 Census of India, the city population was 3,41,831 with a metro population of 419,818. The present city municipal commissioner is Dinesh Kumar.

Functions 
Rajamahendravaram Municipal Corporation is created for the following functions:

 Planning for the town including its surroundings which are covered under its Department's Urban Planning Authority .
 Approving construction of new buildings and authorising use of land for various purposes.
 Improvement of the town's economic and Social status.
 Arrangements of water supply towards commercial,residential and industrial purposes.
 Planning for fire contingencies through Fire Service Departments.
 Creation of solid waste management,public health system and sanitary services.
 Working for the development of ecological aspect like development of Urban Forestry and making guidelines for environmental protection.
 Working for the development of weaker sections of the society like mentally and physically handicapped,old age and gender biased people.
 Making efforts for improvement of slums and poverty removal in the town.

Revenue sources 

The RMC has Income sources for the Corporation from the Central and State Government.
Tax related revenue for the corporation are:
property tax,
profession tax,
entertainment tax,
grants from Central and State Government like Goods and Services Tax and
advertisement tax.
Non-tax related revenue for the corporation are:
water usage charges,
fees from documentation services,
rent received from municipal property and 
funds from municipal bonds.

References

Municipal corporations in Andhra Pradesh
1866 establishments in British India
Rajahmundry